The Creed of the United States Coast Guardsman was written in 1938 by Vice Admiral Harry G. Hamlet, who served as Commandant of the Coast Guard from 1932 to 1936. According to former Commandant Robert Papp, the Creed described the duties and responsibilities that binds the group of Coast Guardsmen together as "shipmates".

The Creed

References

See also
Noncommissioned officer's creed
Soldier's Creed
Quartermaster Creed
Ranger Creed
Rifleman's Creed (USMC)
Sailor's Creed
Airman's Creed

History of the United States Coast Guard
United States Coast Guard
United States Coast Guardsman
1938 documents